There are 9 properties listed on the National Register of Historic Places in Rensselaer, New York, United States.

Listings

|}

References and notes

See also

History of Rensselaer, New York
National Register of Historic Places listings in Rensselaer County, New York
National Register of Historic Places in New York

External links

Rensselaer, New York
History of Rensselaer, New York
Rensselaer